The Mystery of the 13th Guest is a 1943 American crime/mystery film directed by William Beaudine and released by Monogram Pictures. It is based on Armitage Trail's 1929 novel The 13th Guest and is an updated version of the 1932 film The Thirteenth Guest. The film stars Helen Parrish as a young woman who returns to her grandfather's house 13 years after his passing to read his will as per his wishes.

Plot
When Marie Morgan (Helen Parrish) was eight years old, she attended a banquet held by her dying grandfather, who disliked everyone in his family except her. That day he instructed her to return to his house upon her twenty-first birthday to read his will alone. Marie arrives at the house, and although it has been vacant for 13 years, the lights and telephone both appear to be working. Marie thinks back to the day her grandfather told her about his will and recalls the seating arrangement. There were twelve guests in attendance, but a thirteenth place to her grandfather's right was empty. Marie presently decides to open the envelope containing the will. Inside is a sheet of paper with the numbers 13-13-13 written with nothing else. Someone suddenly enters the house and a gunshot is heard, and Marie screams.

She next finds herself sitting at the dinner table in the same place as when she was eight, but the doctor pronounces her dead. Police Lt. Burke (Tim Ryan) and Private Investigator Johnny Smith (Dick Purcell) are put on the case, but it is soon revealed that Marie is still alive. Barksdale (Cyril Ring), Marie's attorney who sat to the left of her at the banquet, is found dead in the exact chair he sat in 13 years ago. The detectives conclude that the killer is targeting the guests by where they sat, and therefore the murderer must have been one of the 13 guests.

Cast
 Helen Parrish  as Marie Morgan - Granddaughter
 Dick Purcell as Johnny Smith - Private detective
 Tim Ryan as Lieut. Burke - Police
 Frank Faylen as Speed DuGan aka McGinis
 Jacqueline Dalya as Marjory Morgan - Cousin
 Paul McVey as Adam Morgan - Uncle
 John Duncan as Harold Morgan - "Bud" -  Marie's brother
 John Dawson as Tom Jackson - Cousin
 Cyril Ring as  John Barksdale - Attorney
 Addison Richards as Jim - District Attorney
 Lloyd Ingraham as Grandfather Morgan

Reception
In comparing it to the 1932 version, Dave Sindelar states that while neither film is excellent, he notes the novelty in the previous film featuring early roles of Ginger Rogers and James Gleason. While he does not find a similar novelty in this version, he admits "it has efficient direction from William Beaudine and the comic relief manage to keep on the right side of annoying."

References

External links
 

American mystery films
1943 films
1940s English-language films
American black-and-white films
Monogram Pictures films
Films based on American novels
Films directed by William Beaudine
Remakes of American films
1943 mystery films
American crime films
1943 crime films
1940s American films